Malea may refer to:

Genera
 Malea (plant), a genus of flowering plant in the family Ericaceae
 Malea (gastropod), a genus of large sea snails, containing two species

Places
 Malea, a village in Zau de Câmpie Commune, Mureș County, Romania
 Maléa, a town in northeastern Guinea
 Malea (Arcadia), a town in ancient Acardia, Greece
 Malea (Lesbos), a town in ancient Lesbos, Greece
 Cape Malea, one of the peninsulas in the southeast of the Peloponnese in Greece
 Malea, ancient name of Cape Agrilia, a peninsula in the southeast of Lesbos, Greece

See also
 Maleia, a river in Romania
 Malia (disambiguation)